Alexandre de Pontes (1968–1993), also known as Xandinho, was a Brazilian bodyboarder, and one of the first Brazilians to gain widespread international recognition in the sport. He was the first Brazilian to reach the finals in the Pipeline world bodyboarding championship. He died in a car accident in Portugal when returning to the airport for a flight back to Brazil.

Six-time world champion Guilherme Tâmega considers Xandinho one of the two greatest bodyboarders of all time, with legend Mike Stewart.

External links

1968 births
1993 deaths
Bodyboarders
Brazilian surfers
Road incident deaths in Portugal